Hunter Bay is a waterway by Prince Edward Island, part of the Alexander Archipelago, in the U.S. state of Alaska. It is situated  eastward of Turn Point. The best channel is on the northern side of the islet. The depths are shallow and the tidal currents are strong in the narrowest part. There is good anchorage in Hunter Bay. Near the south shore of the bay is an islet surrounded by a flat of considerable extent. Klinkwan is a native village on the north shore of Hunter Bay at its entrance; it has a white church with two spires. Klakas Inlet joins Cordova Bay westward of the entrance to Hunter Bay.

References

Bibliography

Bays of Alaska
Bodies of water of Wrangell, Alaska